Stacey Driver (born March 4, 1964 in Griffin, Georgia), played as a running back at Griffin High School, and was given the title of Allstate and All American. In 1982, Driver began his career at Clemson University. He played as a running back for the Tigers until 1985. In 1987 Driver signed with the Cleveland Browns as a free agent; he played for one season before sustaining a serious knee injury.

References 
https://archive.today/20120318054447/http://clemsontigers.cstv.com/sports/m-footbl/archive/clem-m-footbl-alltimlineup.html

External links 
http://www.pro-football-reference.com/players/D/DrivSt20.htm

1964 births
Living people
American football running backs
Clemson Tigers football players
Cleveland Browns players
People from Griffin, Georgia
Players of American football from Georgia (U.S. state)